Dial Records is a music label focusing primarily on post-minimalist dance music (aka. deep house). It was founded in 1999 in Hamburg, Germany by Peter M. Kersten, Paul Kominek and David Lieske. The Label has released a number of influential  12" and full-length albums by artists such as Lawrence, Carsten Jost, Pantha du Prince, Efdemin, John Roberts and others.

Dial Records Catalogue 

DIAL 00     Various  –  Untitled
DIAL 01     Lawrence  –  Sporturlaub
DIAL 02     Carsten Jost  –  Elmenreich
DIAL 03     Various  –  Hoteleins - City
DIAL 04     Various  –  Hamburgeins 01
DIAL 05     Various  –  Hamburgeins 02
DIAL 06     Various  –  Hamburgeins 03
DIAL 07     Carsten Jost  –  Make Pigs Pay
DIAL 08     Pawel  –  Into Pieces
DIAL 09     Lawrence   –  Corporate Identity
DIAL 10     Various  –  Split
DIAL 11     Pantha du Prince  –  Nowhere
DIAL 12     Sten  –  TV
DIAL 13     Various  –  Hamburgerberg - Antifaschistische Aktion
DIAL 14     Alexander Polzin  –  Get Used To It
DIAL 15     Lawrence  –  Neighbourhood
DIAL 16     Various  –  The Lost Tracks
DIAL 17     Sten  –  Eccentric
DIAL 18     Efdemin  –  Kleine Wirrniss EP
DIAL 19     Carsten Jost  –  The Lost Tracks 2
DIAL 20     Pawel  –  Grab It
DIAL 21     Lawrence  –  Winter Green
DIAL 22     Denis Karimani  –  War Es Nicht
DIAL 23     Pantha du Prince  –  Butterfly Girl Versions
DIAL 24     Efdemin  –  Bruxelles
DIAL 25     Dominique  –  Speak To Me
DIAL 26     JaKönigJa  –  Ebba
DIAL 27     nike.bordom  –  Music For Non-Existing Dancefloors
DIAL 28     Sten  –  Take Me To The Fridge
DIAL 29     Pantha du Prince  –  Lichten / Walden
DIAL 30     Various  –  Bergwein
DIAL 31     Lawrence  –  Deep Summer Hole
DIAL 32     Pawel  –  Ceramics
DIAL 33     Pigon  –  Little Albio Street
DIAL 34     Various  –  Split
DIAL 35     Carsten Jost  –  Atlantis I & II
DIAL 36     Sten  –  Undercover
DIAL 37     Lawrence  –  Pond
DIAL 38     Dirk von Lowtzow  –  Septem Sermones ad Mortuos
DIAL 39     Pigon  –  Promises
DIAL 40     Various  –  You Are My Mate

Compact Disc Releases

DIALCD 00     Various  –  Hamburgeins
DIALCD 01     Carsten Jost  –  You Don't Need A Weatherman To Know Which Way The Wind Blows
DIALCD 02     Lawrence  –  Lawrence
DIALCD 03     Glühen 4  –  Das Schweigen der Sirenen
DIALCD 04     Lawrence  –  The Absence Of Blight
DIALCD 05     Pantha du Prince  –  Diamond Daze
DIALCD 06     Sten  –  Leaving The Frantic
DIALCD 07     Lawrence  –  The Night Will Last Forever
DIALCD 08     Phillip Sollmann  –  Something Is Missing
DIALCD 09     Pantha du Prince  –  This Bliss
DIALCD 10     Efdemin  –  Efdemin

See also
 List of record labels

External links
Dial Records Official Website
Dial Records entry at Discogs
Pantha Du Prince

References

German record labels
Electronic music record labels
Techno record labels
Record labels established in 1999
1999 establishments in Germany